Mount Tabor is a rural locality in the Southern Downs Region, Queensland, Australia.

Geography 
The locality is bounded to the south by the Condamine River.

The land use is a mixture of grazing on native vegetation and crop growing.

History 
The locality was named and bounded on 14 September 2001.

Education 
There are no schools in Mount Tabor, but there are numerous schools in neighbouring Warwick. The nearest government primary schools are Warwick East State School and Glennie Heights State School both in neighbouring Warwick to the west. The nearest government secondary school is Warwick State High School, also in Warwick.

References 

Southern Downs Region
Localities in Queensland